The Tender Land is an opera with music by Aaron Copland and libretto by Horace Everett, a pseudonym for Erik Johns.

History
The opera tells of a farm family in the Midwest of the United States.  Copland was inspired to write this opera after viewing the Depression-era photographs of Walker Evans and reading James Agee's Let Us Now Praise Famous Men.  He wrote the work between 1952 and 1954 for the NBC Television Opera Workshop, with the intention of its being presented on television.  However, the television producers rejected the opera.

Eventually, the work had its premiere on April 1, 1954 at the New York City Opera, with Thomas Schippers as the conductor, Jerome Robbins as the director, and a cast including the young Norman Treigle. It was poorly received, with criticism focused on the weaknesses of the opera's characters and the storyline.  Later analysis by Christopher Patton stated that one underlying cause of the opera's failure at the premiere was the contrast between writing for the intimate medium of television, the originally intended medium of the work, versus the more public and larger-scale setting of an opera house.

Patton has also commented on the role of Erik Johns' interest in the Vedanta branch of Hinduism in the libretto.

Copland and Johns made revisions to the opera, expanding Act 2 for performances at Tanglewood in August 1954, and making further adjustments for Oberlin College in 1955.  With the composer's agreement, Murry Sidlin re-scored the work with reduced forces - the same scoring as the original 13 instrument version of Appalachian Spring - for a production in New Haven in 1987, a staging that ran for more than 50 performances. Sidlin also added two of Copland's Old American Songs to the central party scene.

On July 28, 1965, the composer conducted a concert version of his work, as part of the French-American Festival, with the New York Philharmonic.  In the cast were Joy Clements, Claramae Turner, Richard Cassilly, Norman Treigle, and Richard Fredricks.  Three days later, Columbia recorded an abridged version of the opera, again conducted by Copland, at the Manhattan Center, with the same cast.  In 2000, Sony released the historic performance on compact disc.

Roles

Synopsis
The setting is the 1930s in the midwestern United States, at the time of the spring harvest and also of high school graduation.

Act 1
Laurie, the high-school senior daughter of the Moss family, is on the brink of graduating from high school.  At the start of the opera, Beth, Laurie's sister, is dancing by herself, and Ma Moss, Laurie and Beth's mother, is sewing.  The postman, Mr. Splinters, delivers a package with Laurie's graduation dress.  He also brings gossip about a neighbor's daughter being frightened by two strangers to the area.  Ma Moss and Grandpa Moss are worried about this.  Two itinerant workers, Top and Martin, arrive on the scene.  After initial suspicion, Grandpa Moss agrees to hire Top and Martin to help out with the harvest.  Laurie and Martin meet, and feel sympathy for each other.  Top asks for Martin's help later in getting Grandpa Moss drunk at the party that night.

Act 2
The party to celebrate Laurie's graduation is going on.  Everyone has eaten well, and Laurie acknowledges the guests' well wishes to her.  The dance begins.  Ma Moss thinks that Top and Martin are the two strangers reported to be causing trouble in the area, and tells Mr. Splinters, who goes to tell the local sheriff.  As the dance proceeds, Grandpa Moss becomes more drunk.  Laurie and Martin are now in love, and they kiss at one moment.  Grandpa Moss sees this and becomes angry.  Top tells Martin that they should leave, but the sheriff arrives with the news that the two strangers causing the local disturbances have been caught.  Even though Top and Martin have been proven innocent, Grandpa Moss says that they have to leave in the morning.

Act 3
Later that night, Laurie and Martin dream of eloping.  However, Martin changes his mind, with the counsel of Top in the background advising that such a situation would cause great trouble for them all.  During the night, while Laurie is packing, Top and Martin secretly leave.  Laurie is left alone, but then suddenly resolves to leave home and make her own way in the world.  Ma Moss and Beth try to change Laurie's mind, but she is determined to move on.  Ma Moss accepts this eventually.  The opera ends as Laurie leaves, with Beth dancing by herself as she did at the beginning, now the sole hope for future generations of the family and for the farm.

Music
"The Promise of Living" is best known, often performed as a separate choral anthem.

An orchestral suite based on the opera was compiled by Copland in 1958.  In 1996, Murry Sidlin created a new suite, which, like his version of the opera, uses reduced scoring (for soprano, tenor and chamber ensemble).

Copland reused the revivalist song "Zion's Walls" from his second set of Old American Songs in The Tender Land.

Recordings
 Virgin Classics VCD 7 91113-2: Elizabeth Comeaux, Janis Hardy, Maria Jette, LeRoy Lehr, Dan Dressen, James Bohn, Vern Sutton, Agnes Smuda, Merle Fristad, Sue Herber; Orchestra and Chorus of the Plymouth Music Series; Philip Brunelle, conductor
 Koch International Classics 374802: Suzan Hanson, Christine Meadows, Janice Johnson, Kregg Arntson, Milagro Vargas, Amy Hansen, Richard Zeller, Robert MacNeil, Douglas Webster, Scott Tuomi; Third Angle New Music Ensemble conducted by Murry Sidlin (recording of version with reduced scoring)
 Albany - TROY 482/83: University of Kentucky Opera Theatre (Andrea Jones, Dawn Coon, Mary Hawkins, Benjamin Smolder, Judson Perry, Michael Turay, Shederick Whipple, Sherri K. Phelps, Eli Griggs, Charis Strange); Bohuslav Martinu Philharmonic Orchestra conducted by Kirk Trevor

Productions
The first UK production in just under twenty years was staged at Upstairs at the Gatehouse in August 2009, directed by Katherine Hare, conducted by Leigh Thompson and produced by Racky Plews for MadCow Theatre Company.

Northwestern University produced the opera at Cahn Auditorium in Evanston, Illinois on May 18, 19, 20 and 21, 2017.  The program credited Boosey & Hawkes.  The program stated that Copland had been in residence at Northwestern from February 17 to March 2, 1958 giving "lectures on music and composing".  There had been a production conducted by Copland with the Northwestern University Music School on February 28, 1958, also at Cahn Auditorium.

References

External links
 Notes and Libretto
 Synopsis, Recordings, Performance History, etc., from USOpera.com
 Video - Aaron Copland - The Tender Land - Opera - "Laurie's Aria" & "Love Duet" (10:41).
 Video - Aaron Copland - The Tender Land - Opera - "Laurie" & "The Tender Land" (06:39).
 Video - Aaron Copland - The Tender Land - Opera - "The Promise Of Living" (04:59).
 Video - Aaron Copland - The Tender Land - Opera - "Stomp Your Foot" (03:22).

Operas by Aaron Copland
English-language operas
Operas
1954 operas
Operas set in the United States
Opera world premieres at New York City Opera